Mikrevo is a village in Strumyani Municipality, in Blagoevgrad Province, in southwestern Bulgaria.

References

Villages in Blagoevgrad Province